Mustang coffee is a liqueur coffee consisting of coffee, sugar or honey, butter, and raksi (a Nepalese rice or millet wine), with the coffee's quantity double that of the rest of the ingredients. It is particularly famous in Nepal, especially in regions frequented by trekkers.

The coffee is made by browning a mixture of rakshi and butter in a hot pan, and then whisking in the sugar.

Various other spirits can be used to make Mustang coffee, such as Khukuri rum. The Nomad Lounge at Disneyworld serves a variant made with Crown Royal.

Mustang coffee is named after the Mustang district of Nepal.

See also

References

Coffee drinks